Martin Prakkat  is an Indian writer, director and film producer who works in the Malayalam film industry.

Career
Martin started his career as a celebrity photographer and worked with Vanitha Magazine for 10 years. In 2010, Martin directed Best Actor starring Mammootty in the lead role. The movie was a commercial success and received positive reviews from critics. His second movie as a director was American-born Confused Desi (ABCD) starring Dulquer Salman and Aparna Gopinath. The movie was released in 2013 and went on to become a box office success. His latest movie Nayattu was released on 08 April 2021. 

Charlie was the highlight at the Kerala State Film Awards 2015 winning in 8 categories, with Martin bagging the award for the best director, Martin-Unni R. combo winning the award for best screenplay, Dulquer winning the best actor for his performance in Charlie and Parvathy winning the best actress award for her performance in Charlie and Ennu Ninte Moideen. Cinematographer of the movie, Jomon T. John bagged the award for the best cinematographer for his work in Charlie, Ennu Ninte Moideen and Nee-Na.

Filmography 

 As actor 
  Theevram - as himself, Cameo appearance

Awards
Kerala State Film Awards
2015 Kerala State Film Award for Best Director for Charlie
2015 Kerala State Film Award for Best Screenplay for Charlie

References

External links

20th-century Indian film directors
Malayalam film directors
Living people
Malayalam screenwriters
Year of birth missing (living people)